Melilla Club de Fútbol was a Spanish football team based in the autonomous city of Melilla. Founded in 1946 as Club Deportivo Tesorillo and dissolved in 1976, it played for four consecutive seasons in Segunda División.

History
Founded in 1946 as Club Deportivo Tesorillo, the club was renamed Melilla Club de Fútbol in August 1956, after the dissolution of UD Melilla. Having won promotion to Tercera División in that year, they played for six consecutive seasons in the category, achieving an impressive first place in their debut season.

The club reached Segunda División in 1962, and played for four consecutive seasons in the category before suffering relegation. They went on to play in the third division until 1976, and after suffering relegation, they merged with Club Gimnástico de Cabrerizas, which had won promotion to the third level, to create Gimnástico Melilla Club de Fútbol.

Club background
Juventud Español — (1940–43)
Melilla Fútbol Club — (1921–43)
Unión Deportiva Melilla — (1943–56)
Club Deportivo Tesorillo — (1940–56)
Melilla Club de Fútbol – (1956–76)
Club Gimnástico de Cabrerizas – (1973–76)
Sociedad Deportiva Melilla – (1970–76)
Gimnástico Melilla Club de Fútbol – (1976–80)
Unión Deportiva Melilla – (1980–)

Other clubs from Melilla
Club Deportivo Real Melilla — (1939–)
Club de Fútbol Melilla Industrial – (1968–74)
Club de Fútbol Industrial Melilla – (1975–85)
Melilla Fútbol Club — (1985–91)

Season to season

4 seasons in Segunda División
16 seasons in Tercera División

References

 
Football clubs in Melilla
Association football clubs established in 1946
Association football clubs disestablished in 1976
1946 establishments in Spain
1976 establishments in Spain
Segunda División clubs